Shyamaprasad (born 7 November 1960) is an Indian filmmaker, screenwriter and actor from Kerala.

Career
Shyamaprasad was born on 7 November 1960 at Palakkad, as the younger son of O. Rajagopal and Santhakumari. He was named after Shyama Prasad Mukherjee, the founder of Bharatiya Jan Sangh.

He did his schooling at Basel Evangelical Mission Higher Secondary School, Palakkad. After completing his degree in Theatre Arts from the School of Drama and Fine Arts, Thrissur, Calicut University, Shyamaprasad received the Commonwealth Scholarship in 1989 and did his Master in Media Production at the Hull University, England. He worked as an intern at the BBC and Channel 4, to Indian television and redefined the parameters of telefilms and documentaries in Malayalam Television with Doordarshan. He serves as the President (Programming) at Amrita TV.

His features for TV and cinema have won him several national and state awards namely Agnisakshi and Akale, produced by Tom George Kolath, had been adjudged the best regional cinema films of the nation in 1998 and 2004.

For television, he has adapted the works of Anton Chekhov (Vivahalochana); Albert Camus (The Just); Vaikom Muhammad Basheer (Viswavikhyathamaya Mookku); Madhavikkutty (Venalinte Ozhivu); N Mohanan (Peruvazhiyile Kariyilakal); Sarah Joseph (Nilavariyunnu), N. P. Mohammed (Ullurukkam) and K. Radhakrishnan (Shamanathalam). He was awarded the Best Television Director prize for the year 1993, 1994 and 1996.

Shyamaprasad had been invited to serve twice as the jury of the National Film Awards. His 2007 production Ore Kadal, based on a Bengali novel by Sunil Gangopadhyay, was chosen as the inaugural film of the Indian Panorama at the International Film Festival of India 2007.

His film Ritu (Seasons) released in early August 2009 is seen by one reporter as the 'coming of age' of Malayalam cinema.

He won the Best Director prize of the fiercely contested Kerala State Film Awards 5 times- namely for his films Agnisakshi, Akale, Elektra, Artist and Oru Njayarazhcha.

Personal life

He currently resides in Thiruvananthapuram, Kerala.

Filmography

Awards
National Film Awards
 1998 – National Film Award for Best Feature Film in Malayalam: Agnisakshi
 2004 – National Film Award for Best Feature Film in Malayalam: Akale
 2007 – National Film Award for Best Feature Film in Malayalam: Ore Kadal

Kerala State Film Awards
 1998 – Kerala State Film Award for Best Film : Agnisakshi
 1998 – Kerala State Film Award for Best Director : Agnisakshi
 2004 – Kerala State Film Award for Best Director : Akale
 2004 – Kerala State Film Award for Best Film : Akale
 2007 – Kerala State Film Award for Second Best Film : Ore Kadal
 2010 – Kerala State Film Award for Best Director : Elektra
 2013 – Kerala State Film Award for Best Director : Artist
 2018 – Kerala State Film Award for Best Director : Oru Njayarazhcha
 2018 – Kerala State Film Award for Second Best Film : Oru Njayarazhcha

Kerala Film Critics Association Awards
 1999 – Kerala Film Critics Association Award for Best Film : Agnisakshi
 1999 – Kerala Film Critics Association Award for Best Director : Agnisakshi
 2007 – Kerala Film Critics Association Award for Best Film : Ore Kadal
 2007 – Kerala Film Critics Association Award for Best Director : Ore Kadal

Filmfare Awards South
 1999 – Filmfare Award for Best Director – Malayalam : Agnisakshi
 2013 – Filmfare Award for Best Director – Malayalam : Artist

Other awards
 1999 – Asianet Film Awards for Best Director : Agnisakshi
 1999 – Gollapudi Srinivas Award : Agnisakshi
 1999 – Aravindan Puraskaram for Best Debutant Director : Agnisakshi
 2004 – Film Fans Association Awards : Akale
 2004 – Mathrubhumi Film Awards for Special Jury Prize : Akale
 2007 – FIPRESCI Award for Best Malayalam Film at IFFK : Ore Kadal
 2007 – NETPAC Award for Best Malayalam film at IFFK : Ore Kadal
 2007 – The German Star at the Stuttgart Film Festival : Ore Kadal
 2007 – Amrita Film Award for Best Director : Ore Kadal
 2007 – AMMA Annual Movie Award for Best Film : Ore Kadal 
 2007 – John Abraham Award for Best Malayalam Film : Ore Kadal
 2007 – Malayalam Viewers Award for Best Film : Ore Kadal

References

External links
Official web page 

'Cinema of  Malayalam' profile
 'Ullurukkam – Documentary by Shyamaprasad'
Keralacafe Movie Blog
 Kerala cafe
*Shyama Prasad' s Ivide !

Film directors from Kerala
Malayalam film directors
Kerala State Film Award winners
1960 births
Living people
Filmfare Awards South winners
20th-century Indian film directors
21st-century Indian film directors
Artists from Palakkad
Screenwriters from Kerala
Male actors in Malayalam cinema
Indian male film actors
Malayalam film producers
Film producers from Kerala
University of Calicut alumni